Rendezvous at Midnight is a 1935 American mystery film directed by Christy Cabanne and starring Ralph Bellamy, Valerie Hobson, Catherine Doucet and Irene Ware. The film was produced and distributed by Hollywood studio Universal Pictures. The film's title was originally intended for Secret of the Chateau, released the previous year, and the working title was then recycled for this film.

Plot
Sandra Rogers is irritated that her fiancée police commissioner Robert Edmonds is always too busy with work to see her. She gain his attention she jokingly confesses to having just committed a murder of a ruthless businessman, suspicion then seems to point towards her when he is really discovered to be dead.

Cast 
Ralph Bellamy as Commissioner Robert Edmonds
Valerie Hobson as Sandra Rogers
Catherine Doucet as Fernande
Irene Ware as Myra
Helen Jerome Eddy as Emmy
Purnell Pratt as The Mayor 
Kathlyn Williams as Mrs. Arthur Dewey
Edgar Kennedy as Mahoney
Vivien Oakland as Lillian Haskins
Arthur Vinton as Myles Crawford
William P. Carleton as Judge 
Luis Alberni as Janitor

References

Bibliography
 Weaver, Tom & Brunas, Michael & Brunas, John. Universal Horrors: The Studio's Classic Films, 1931-1946. McFarland & Company, 2007.

External links 
 

1935 films
American mystery films
1935 mystery films
Universal Pictures films
Films directed by Christy Cabanne
American black-and-white films
1930s English-language films
1930s American films